The White Lightning WLAC-1 is an American four-seat single-engined monoplane designed for amateur construction by Nick Jones and sold as kits by the White Lighting Aircraft Corporation of South Carolina.

In the 1990s the aircraft design was sold in kit form by Reflex Fiberglass Works of Walterboro, South Carolina.

Development
The WLAC-1 is a low-wing monoplane powered by a 210 hp (157 kW) Continental IO-360 piston engine. Of composite construction, it has a retractable nose-wheel landing gear.  The four-seats had an unusual arrangement in that the rear two seats face backwards. Kits to build the aircraft were sold for amateur construction.  The project is currently managed by Will and Bill Fields.  Will has raced the plane in the Reno National Championship races with two wins since 2002.

The prototype first flew on 8 March 1986 as the Jones White Lightning.

Specifications

References

Notes

Bibliography

White Lightning WLAC-1
1980s United States civil utility aircraft
Homebuilt aircraft
Low-wing aircraft